Belgium competed at the 1952 Summer Olympics in Helsinki, Finland. 135 competitors, 130 men and 5 women, took part in 75 events in 16 sports.

Medalists

Gold
 André Noyelle — Cycling, Men's Individual Road Race
 Robert Grondelaers, André Noyelle and Lucien Victor — Cycling, Men's Team Road Race

Silver
 Robert Grondelaers — Cycling, Men's Individual Road Race
 Bob Baetens and Michel Knuysen — Rowing, Men's Coxless Pairs

Athletics

Basketball

Men's Team Competition
Qualification Round (Group A)
 Lost to Cuba (51-59)
 Defeated Switzerland (59-49)
 Lost to Cuba (63-71) → did not advance

Boxing

Canoeing

Cycling

Road Competition
Men's Individual Road Race (190.4 km)
André Noyelle — 5:06:03.4 (→  Gold Medal)
Robert Grondelaers — 5:06:51.2 (→  Silver Medal)
Lucien Victor — 5:07:52.0 (→ 4th place)
Rik Van Looy — did not finish (→ no ranking)

Track Competition
Men's 1.000m Time Trial
Joseph De Bakker
 Final — 1:14.7 (→ 10th place)

Men's 1.000m Sprint Scratch Race
Stéphan Martens — 10th place

Men's 4.000m Team Pursuit
Gabriel Glorieux, José Pauwels, Paul De Paepe, and Robert Raymond  
 Eliminated in quarterfinals (→ 5th place)

Fencing

14 fencers, all men, represented Belgium in 1952.

Men's foil
 André Verhalle
 Paul Valcke
 Gustave Ballister

Men's team foil
 Pierre Van Houdt, André Verhalle, Alex Bourgeois, Paul Valcke, Édouard Yves, Gustave Ballister

Men's épée
 Jean-Baptiste Maquet
 Ghislain Delaunois
 Robert Henrion

Men's team épée
 Ghislain Delaunois, Jean-Baptiste Maquet, Albert Bernard, Robert Henrion, Paul Valcke

Men's sabre
 Gustave Ballister
 François Heywaert
 Marcel Van Der Auwera

Men's team sabre
 Marcel Van Der Auwera, Gustave Ballister, François Heywaert, Robert Bayot, Georges de Bourguignon, Édouard Yves

Gymnastics

Hockey

Modern pentathlon

One male pentathlete represented Belgium in 1952.

 Francis Plumerel

Rowing

Belgium had 12 male rowers participate in five out of seven rowing events in 1952.

 Men's single sculls
 Henri Steenacker

 Men's double sculls
 Robert George
 Jos Van Stichel

 Men's coxless pair
 Michel Knuysen
 Bob Baetens

 Men's coxed pair
 Hippolyte Mattelé
 Eugeen Jacobs
 Kamiel Van Dooren (cox)

 Men's coxless four
 Charles Van Antwerpen
 Jos Rosa
 Harry Elzendoorn
 Florent Caers

Sailing

Shooting

Four shooters represented Belgium in 1952.

50 m rifle, three positions
 Frans Lafortune
 Jacques Lafortune

50 m rifle, prone
 Frans Lafortune
 Jacques Lafortune

Trap
 Albert Fichefet
 Gaston Van Roy

Swimming

Water polo

Weightlifting

Wrestling

References

Nations at the 1952 Summer Olympics
1952
Olympics